The Leeuwenhoek Lecture is a prize lecture of the Royal Society to recognize achievement in microbiology. The prize was originally given in 1950 and awarded annually, but from 2006 to 2018 was given triennially. From 2018 it will be awarded biennially. 

The prize is named after the Dutch microscopist Antonie van Leeuwenhoek and was instituted in 1948 from a bequest from George Gabb. A gift of £2000 is associated with the lecture.

Leeuwenhoek Lecturers
The following is a list of Leeuwenhoek Lecture award winners along with the title of their lecture:

21st Century
 2022 Sjors Scheres, for ground-breaking contributions and innovations in image analysis and reconstruction methods in electron cryo-microscopy, enabling the structure determination of complex macromolecules of fundamental biological and medical importance to atomic resolution
 2020 Geoffrey L. Smith, for his studies of poxviruses which has had major impact in wider areas, notably vaccine development, biotechnology, host-pathogen interactions and innate immunity 
 2018 Sarah Cleaveland, Can we make rabies history? Realising the value of research for the global elimination of rabies
 2015 Jeffrey Errington, for his seminal discoveries in relation to the cell cycle and cell morphogenesis in bacteria
 2012 Brad Amos, How new science is transforming the optical microscope
 2010 Robert Gordon Webster, Pandemic Influenza: one flu over the cuckoo's nest
 2006 Richard Anthony Crowther,  Microscopy goes cold: frozen viruses reveal their structural secrets.
 2005 Keith Chater, Streptomyces inside out: a new perspective on the bacteria that provide us with antibiotics.
 2004 David Sherratt, A bugs life
 2003 Brian Spratt, Bacterial populations and bacterial disease
 2002 Stephen West,  DNA repair from microbes to man
 2001 Robin Weiss, From Pan to pandemic: animal to human infections

20th Century
 2000 Howard Dalton, The natural and unnatural history of methane-oxidising bacteria
 1999 Peter C. Doherty, Killer T cells and virus infections
 1998 George A.M. Cross, The genetics and cell biology of antigenic variation in trypanosomes
 1997 Peter Biggs, Mareks disease, tumours and prevention
 1996 Julian Davies, Microbial molecular diversity - function, evolution and applications
 1995 John Guest, Adaptation to life without oxygen
 1994 Keith Vickerman, The opportunistic parasite
 1993 Fred Brown, Peptide vaccines, dream or reality.
 1992 John Postgate, Bacterial evolution and the nitrogen-fixing plant
 1991 Harry Smith, The influence of the host on microbes that cause disease
 1990 John Skehel, How enveloped viruses enter cells
 1989 Piet Borst, Antigenic variation in African trypanosomes
 1988 Alfred Rupert Hall, Antoni van Leeuwenhoek (1632-1723) and Anglo-Dutch collaboration
 1987 David Alan Hopwood, Towards an understanding of gene switching in streptomyces, the basis of sporulation and antibiotic production
 1986 William Fleming Hoggan Jarrett, Environmental carcinogens and paillomaviruses in the pathogenesis of cancer.
 1985 Kenneth Murray, A molecular biologist's view of viral hepatitis
 1984 William Duncan Paterson Stewart, The functional organisation of nitrogen-fixing cyanobacteria.
 1983 Michael Anthony Epstein, A prototype vaccine to prevent Epstein-Barr (E.B.) virus-associated tumours.
 1982 Hamao Umezawa, Studies of microbial products in rising to the challenge of curing cancer
 1981 Frank William Ernest Gibson, The biochemical and genetic approach to the study of bioenergetics with the use of Escherichia coli: progress and prospects.
 1980 David Arthur John Tyrrell, Is it a virus?
 1979 Patricia Hannah Clarke, Experiments in microbial evolution: new enzymes, new metabolic activities.
 1978 Hugh John Forster Cairns, Bacteria as proper subjects for cancer research.
 1977 Francois Jacob, Mouse teratocarcinoma and mouse embryo.
 1976 Geoffrey Herbert Beale, The varied contributions of protozoa to genetical knowledge
 1975 Joel Mandelstam, Bacterial sporulation: a problem in the biochemistry and genetics of a primitive development system.
 1974 Renato Dulbecco, The control of cell growth regulation by tumour-inducing viruses: a challenging problem.
 1973 Aaron Klug, The structure and assembly of regular viruses
 1972 Hans Leo Kornberg, Carbohydrate transport by micro-organisms
 1971 Michael George Parke Stoker, Tumour viruses and the sociology of fibroblasts
 1970 Philip Herries Gregory, Airborne microbes: their significance and distribution
 1969 Jacques Lucien Monod, Cellular and molecular cybernetics.
 1968 Gordon Elliott Fogg, The physiology of an algal nuisance
 1967 James Baddiley, Teichoic acids and the molecular structure of bacterial walls
 1966 Percy Wragg Brian, Obligate parasitism in fungi
 1965 William Hayes, Some controversial aspects of bacterial sexuality
 1964 Donald Devereux Woods, A pattern of research with two bacterial growth factors
 1963 Norman Wingate Pirie, The size of small organisms
 1962 Guido Pontecorvo, Microbial genetics: achievements and prospects
 1961 Frank John Fenner, Interactions between poxviruses
 1960 Andre Michel Lwoff, Viral functions
 1959 Frederick Charles Bawden, Viruses: retrospect and prospect
 1958 David Keilin, The problem of anabiosis or latent life: history and current concepts
 1957 Wilson Smith, Virus-host cell interactions
 1956 Ernest Frederick Gale, The biochemical organization of the bacterial cell
 1955 Henry Gerard Thornton, The ecology of micro-organisms in soil.
 1954 Juda Hirsch Quastel, Soil metabolism
 1953 Kenneth Manley Smith, Some aspects of the behaviour of certain viruses in their hosts and of their development in the cell.
 1952 Albert Jan Kluyver, The changing appraisal of the microbe
 1951 Christopher Howard Andrewes, The place of viruses in nature
 1950 Paul Gordon Fildes, The development of microbiology.

References

Antonie van Leeuwenhoek
Biology education in the United Kingdom
Microbiology organizations
Royal Society lecture series